Echternacherbrück is a German municipality located on the Sauer river opposite the Luxembourgish town of Echternach. It is part of the district Bitburg-Prüm, in Rhineland-Palatinate. It includes the district of Fölkenbach. One of its main places of interest is the "Liboriuskapelle", a chapel located on the slopes of the Ferschweiler plateau.

References

Germany–Luxembourg border crossings
Bitburg-Prüm